Catnip, Nepeta cataria, is a species in the family Lamiaceae (mint).

Catnip may also refer to:
 Nepeta, cat mint or catnip, the plant genus
 Nepetalactone, the cat attractant in the catnip plant
 Methcathinone, a drug sometimes called "catnip"

See also
 Catmint (disambiguation)